Phước Hòa may refer to several places in Vietnam, including:

Phước Hòa, Khánh Hòa, a ward of Nha Trang
Phước Hòa, Tam Kỳ, a ward of Tam Kỳ in Quảng Nam Province
Phước Hòa, Bà Rịa-Vũng Tàu, a ward of Phú Mỹ
Phước Hòa, Ninh Thuận, a commune of Bác Ái District
Phước Hòa, Bình Dương, a commune of Phú Giáo District
Phước Hòa, Phước Sơn, a commune of Phước Sơn District in Quảng Nam Province
Phước Hòa, Bình Định, a commune of Tuy Phước District